Kim Jong-gwan is a North Korean politician and military officer who is the Minister of People's Armed Forces since December 2019 to September 2021.

Biography
Kim is a General of the Korean People's Army and previously commanded the General Construction Bureau. In May 2016, he was appointed a member of the 7th Central Committee of the Workers' Party of Korea at the 7th Congress of the Workers' Party of Korea. In March 2009, he was elected the 12th convocation for the 334th district of the Supreme People's Assembly. He was a member of the Funeral committee of Ri Ul-sol who died in August 2015 and Kim Yong-chun who died in August 2018. In December 2019 he was appointed to the Minister of People's Armed Forces and promoted to General and became also an alternate member of the Politburo of the Central Committee of the Workers' Party of Korea.

References

Living people
North Korean generals
Members of the Supreme People's Assembly
Defence ministers of North Korea
Year of birth missing (living people)
Members of the 8th Politburo of the Workers' Party of Korea
Members of the 8th Central Committee of the Workers' Party of Korea